Eatons Neck Light has served as a navigational aid since its construction in 1798. Designed by John McComb, Jr., it is one of only two 18th century lighthouses still standing in New York State, the other is the Montauk Point Light.

Chronology of lighthouse 

1798, March 14:  $13,250 was appropriated for the lighthouse to be built.
1798, June 16:  Ten acres were bought from John Gardiner for $500.
1798, July 2:  President John Adams authorized construction of the light.
1798, December 6:  Construction of the lighthouse was completed.
1799, January 1:  The light was first lit.
1837: An inspection found the light to be defective.
1838:  Twelve lamps with 13-inch reflectors were installed to improve the visibility of the light.
1842:   reflectors were installed.
1850:  Thirteen lamps with  reflectors were installed.
1858:  A new lantern and a third order Fresnel lens were installed.
1867, March 2:  Congress approved funds needed to renovate the lighthouse.
1868:  Renovations completed included the replacing the old wooden stairs with iron stairs with landings, the interior walls were lined with brick, the :keeper's quarters were expanded and the steam fog signal was installed.
1880:  The keeper's quarters were renovated.
1907:  The oil lamp was replaced with an oil vapor lamp.
1921:  The light was electrified.
1961:  The light was automated.

-- Data from the United States Coast Guard

The lighthouse was listed on the National Register of Historic Places in 1973.

References

External links 
 Long Island Lighthouses page
 Station Eaton's Neck, New York, U.S. Coast Guard History Program

Lighthouses completed in 1798
Towers completed in 1798
National Register of Historic Places in Huntington (town), New York
Eatons Neck
Lighthouses in Suffolk County, New York